Another Weekend may refer to:

"Another Weekend" (Five Star song), 1988
"Another Weekend", 2017 song by Ariel Pink from the album Dedicated to Bobby Jameson